Hans Zimmer is a German film score composer, he has received several awards and nominations throughout his career including two Academy Awards out of twelve nominations, a Critics' Choice Movie Award, two Golden Globe Awards, four Grammy Awards and two Primetime Emmy Award nominations, among others.

His first Academy Award nomination came in 1988 for his work in Barry Levinson's drama film Rain Man. In 1994, he scored the animated film The Lion King, for which he won his first Academy Award. He also won the Golden Globe Award for Best Original Score and two Grammy Awards, Best Musical Album for Children for the film's soundtrack and Best Instrumental Arrangement with Accompanying Vocals for the song "Circle of Life". He also received a nomination for the Tony Award for Best Original Score for the musical based on the film.

In 2000, he scored Ridley Scott's historical drama Gladiator alongside Lisa Gerrard, for the film, he received nominations for the Academy Awards, BAFTA Awards and won the Critics' Choice Movie Award for Best Composer and a second Golden Globe Award. In 2008, he collaborated with James Newton Howard for Christopher Nolan's The Dark Knight, their work received several nominations and won a Classical Brit Award and a Grammy Award.

He continued collaborating with Christopher Nolan, scoring Inception (2009), Interstellar (2014) and Dunkirk (2017), the films gave Zimmer his ninth, tenth and eleventh Academy Award nominations for Best Original Score, respectively, alongside receiving nominations for each film at the BAFTA Awards, Critics' Choice Awards and Golden Globe Awards. Zimmer has also collaborated with Steve McQueen, in 12 Years a Slave  (2013), and Widows (2018), receiving Golden Globe nominations for both films.

In 2017, he scored Denis Villeneuve's Blade Runner 2049 alongside Benjamin Wallfisch, receiving a BAFTA Awards nomination for the film. In 2019, Zimmer scored the 2019 remake of The Lion King, receiving two Grammy Award nominations. In 2021, he collaborated again with Villeneuve in Dune, for his work, he won various awards from critics associations, including an Academy Award; he is also nominated for a Grammy.

Academy Awards
The Academy Awards are a set of awards given by the Academy of Motion Picture Arts and Sciences annually for excellence of cinematic achievements. Zimmer has won twice out of twelve nominations.

Annie Awards
The Annie Awards are presented annually by ASIFA-Hollywood to recognize excellence in animation.

BAFTA Awards

British Academy Film Awards
The British Academy Film Award is an annual award show presented by the British Academy of Film and Television Arts.

British Academy Games Awards
The British Academy Games Awards is an annual award show presented by the British Academy of Film and Television Arts to recognize the best in the video game industry.

British Academy Television Craft Awards
The British Academy Television Craft Awards is an annual award show presented by the British Academy of Film and Television Arts to recognize the best in crafts for television productions.

Classic Brit Awards
The Classic Brit Awards are presented by the British Phonographic Industry.

Critics' Choice Movie Awards
The Critics' Choice Movie Awards are presented annually since 1995 by the Broadcast Film Critics Association for outstanding achievements in the cinema industry.

Golden Globe Awards
The Golden Globe Award is an accolade bestowed by the 93 members of the Hollywood Foreign Press Association (HFPA) recognizing excellence in film and television, both domestic and foreign.

Grammy Awards
The Grammy Award is an annual award show presented by The Recording Academy.

Hollywood Music in Media Awards
The Hollywood Music in Media Awards (HMMA) in an organization that honours the best in original music for media.

Primetime Emmy Awards
The Primetime Emmy Awards are presented annually by the Academy of Television Arts & Sciences, also known as the Television Academy, to recognize and honor achievements in the television industry.

Saturn Awards
The Saturn Awards are presented by the Academy of Science Fiction, Fantasy and Horror Films.

Satellite Awards
The Satellite Awards are a set of annual awards given by the International Press Academy.

Tony Awards
The Tony Awards are presented annually by the American Theatre Wing and The Broadway League to recognize the excellence in live Broadway theatre.

Various awards and nominations

Critics associations

References

External links 
 

Zimmer, Hans